In cell biology, bulk flow is the process by which proteins with a sorting signal  travel to and from different cellular compartments. In other words, bulk transport is a type of transport which involves the transport of large amount of substance like lipid droplets and solid food particles across plasma membrane by utilising energy. Special processes are involved in the transport of such large quantities of materials, which include endocytosis and exocytosis.

It is thought that cargo travels through the Golgi cisternae (from cis- to trans- Golgi) via bulk flow.

See also

 Protein targeting
 Vesicle (biology)
 COPI
 COPII
 Mass flow

References 

1. Rothman J.E. and Weiland F.T. Protein sorting by transport vesicles. Science 272. 227-234. 1996.

Protein targeting